Charro has several meanings, but it generally refers to Mexican horse riders, who maintain traditional dress, such as some form of sombrero, which in Mexican Spanish are called sombrero de charro (a charro's hat). The charros could also be thought of as old Mexican cowboys who dress like such, although more modern dress is now seen on those who still work the ranches (rancheros). See also, vaquero.

Also old Mexican outlaws, bandits, revolutionaries, bounty hunters, and gunmen who wore similar dress are also called charro.

The traditional charro competition charreada (similar to a rodeo) has become the official sport of Mexico and maintains traditional rules and regulations in effect from colonial times up to the Mexican Revolution.

Etymology

The word charro (syn. charrar, charra) is first documented in Spain in the book “Vocabulario de refranes y frases proverbiales” published in 1627 by Gonzalo Correas as a synonym of dumb or stupid person. In 1729, the first dictionary of the Spanish language edited by the Real Academia Española, the “Diccionario de Autoridades”, defined “charro” as: “The uneducated and unpolished person, raised in a place of little policing. In the Court, and in other places, they give this name to any person from the countryside”. The first edition of the Real Academia dictionary published in 1780, defined charro as: “the rough and rustic person, as the villagers tend to be”; but they would add a second meaning for the first time: “adjective that is applied to some things that are too laden with decoration and in bad taste”. The 1786 Spanish-English dictionary “Diccionario Español e Inglés”, defined Charro as: “rustic, country like”. While the 1802 Spanish-English dictionary “A New Dictionary of the Spanish and English Languages”, defined charro as: “a clownish, coarse, ill-bred person” and “Gaudy, loaded with ornaments in a tasteless and paltry manner”. It wasn’t until the fourth edition of the Real Academia dictionary in 1803, that they added: “aldeano de Salamanca” (villager from Salamanca) as one of its definitions. In his 1745 Spanish-Basque-Latin dictionary, the Basque jesuit priest Manuel de Larramendi, defined charro as a “villager” or “country person” and argued that it was of Basque origin, meaning “vile and despicable thing”. In 1787, historian and philosopher Antonio de Capmany y Montpalau, argued that the etymology of the word was Arabic and that it originally meant “bad of moral malice and of customs” passing on to the Spanish to mean artistic malice, thus something “charro” is something gaudy, overloaded with ornaments. In the 20th century, the Catalan philologist and linguist Joan Coromines defined it as a synonym of "unsophisticated" or “unpolished” (basto), "person who speaks roughly" (tosco), "person of the land" (aldeano, ie. "Aldeano de Salamanca"), "person with poor taste", and attributes its origins to the Basque language from the word txar which means "bad", "unimportant", "not worthy of attention". Today the Real Academia maintains the same definition and origin. In Mexico, Charro was originally applied as a pejorative name for the Mexican rancheros during the 18th century, for their gaudy costumes and their country manners and customs, which were seen as barbaric by the elites. The word ‘Ranchero’ is the actual true name of the Mexican horseman dedicated to the maintenance of cattle and horses, working as vaqueros, horse-tamers, caporales (foremen), and other rural jobs. The title of ranchero derives from Rancho which in Mexican Spanish it is a unit of land in the countryside were cattle is raised and crops are sowed.

Origins

The Viceroyalty of New Spain had prohibited Native Americans from riding or owning horses, with the exception of the Tlaxcaltec nobility, other allied chieftains, and their descendants. However, cattle raising required the use of horses, for which farmers would hire cowboys who were preferably mestizo and, rarely, Indians. Some of the requirements for riding a horse were that one had to be employed by a plantation, had to use saddles that differed from those used by the military, and had to wear leather clothing from which the term "cuerudo" (leathered one) originated.

Over time landowners and their employees, starting with those living in the Mexican Plateau and later the rest of the country, adapted their cowboy style to better suit the Mexican terrain and temperature, evolving away from the Spanish style of cattle raising. After the Mexican War of Independence horse riding grew in popularity. Many riders of mixed race became mounted mercenaries, messengers and plantation workers. Originally known as Chinacos, these horsemen later became the modern "vaqueros". Wealthy plantation owners would often acquire decorated versions of the distinctive Charro clothing and horse harness to display their status in the community. Poorer riders would also equip their horses with harness made from agave or would border their saddles with chamois skin.

Mexican War of Independence and the 19th century 

As the Mexican War of Independence began in 1810 and continued for the next 11 years, charros were very important soldiers on both sides of the war. Many haciendas, or Spanish owned estates, had a long tradition of gathering their best charros as a small militia for the estate to fend off bandits and marauders. When the War for Independence started, many haciendas had their own armies in an attempt to fend off early struggles for independence.

After independence was achieved in 1821, political disorder made law and order hard to establish throughout much of Mexico. Large bands of bandits plagued the early 19th century as a result of lack of legitimate ways for social advance. One of the most notable gang was called "the silver ones" or the "plateados"; these thieves dressed as traditional wealthy charros, adorning their clothing and saddles with much silver, channeling the elite horseman image. The bandit gangs would disobey or buy out government, establishing their own profit and rules.

Towards the mid 19th century, however, President Juárez established the "rurales" or mounted rural police to crack down on gangs and enforce national law across Mexico. It was these rurales that helped to establish the charro look as one of manhood, strength, and nationhood. 

During the Second Mexican Empire, Maximilian I of Mexico reigned as emperor and liked to wear a charro suit as the national costume to ingratiate himself with his subjects. He was an avid and skilled horsemen and impressed by the local charros. Emperor Maximilian himself designed the elegant all black charro traje, or costume, as acceptable attire for formal occasions, which the charros and mariachi ensembles by extension still use in modern days. 

Charros were quickly seen as national heroes as Mexican politicians in the late 19th century pushed for the romanticized charro lifestyle and image as an attempt to unite the nation after the conservative and liberal clashes.

Early twentieth-century usage

Prior to the Mexican Revolution of 1910, the distinctive charro suit, with its sombrero, sarape, heavily embroidered jacket and tightly cut trousers, was widely worn by men of the affluent upper classes on social occasions, especially when on horseback. A light grey version with silver embroidery served as the uniform of the rurales (mounted rural police).

However, the most notable example of 'charrería' is General Emiliano Zapata who was known before the revolution as a skilled rider and horse tamer.

Although it is said that charros came from the states of Jalisco in Mexico, it was not until the 1930s that charrería became a rules sport, as rural people began moving towards the cities. During this time, paintings of charros also became popular.

During World War II an army of 150,000 charros was created, the "Legión de Guerrilleros Mexicanos", in anticipation of an eventual attack of German forces. It was led by Antolin Jimenez Gamas, president of the National Association of Charros, a former soldier of Pancho Villa during the Mexican Revolution who climbed the ranks to Lieutenant Colonel in the Personal Guard of Villa's Dorados.

Use of term
In Spain, a charro is a native of the province of Salamanca also known by Campo Charro, especially in the area of Alba de Tormes, Vitigudino, Ciudad Rodrigo and Ledesma. It's likely that the Mexican charro tradition derived from Spanish horsemen who came from Salamanca and settled in México.

The traditional Mexican charro is known for colorful clothing and participating in coleadero y charreada, a specific type of Mexican rodeo. The charreada is the national sport in Mexico, and is regulated by the Federación Mexicana de Charrería.

In cinema
The "charro film" was a genre of the Golden Age of Mexican cinema between 1935 and 1959, and probably played a large role in popularizing the charro, akin to what occurred with the advent of the American Western. The most notable charro stars were José Alfredo Jiménez, Pedro Infante, Jorge Negrete, Antonio Aguilar, and Tito Guizar.

Modern day 
In both Mexican and US states such as California, Texas, Illinois and all of the states of Mexico, charros participate in tournaments to show off their skill either in team competition charreada, or in individual competition such as coleadero. These events are practiced in a Lienzo charro.

Some decades ago charros in Mexico were permitted to carry guns. In conformity with current law, the charro must be fully suited and be a fully pledged member of Mexico's Federación Mexicana de Charrería.

See also
Charro Days
Charro outfit
Sombrero
Sombrero Festival
Frijoles charros

References

External links

Arte en la Charerria: The Artisanship of Mexican Equestrian Culture at the National Cowboy & Western Heritage Museum, Oklahoma City
Art of the Charrería at the Museum of the American West

Charreria, the symbol of Mexico
Federación Mexicana de Charrería (Spanish)
Nacional de Charros (Spanish)
Official Rulebook (Spanish)
"CHARRO USA" U.S. Radio, Magazine and Media News off Charreria (Mexican Rodeo)

Animal husbandry occupations
Charreada
Horse-related professions and professionals
Mexican culture
Sport in Mexico
Pastoralists
National symbols of Mexico
Horse history and evolution